Kostino is a rural locality (a village) in Petushinskoye Rural Settlement, Petushinsky District, Vladimir Oblast, Russia. The population was 909 as of 2010. There are 17 streets.

Geography 
Kostino is located 18 km northwest of Petushki (the district's administrative centre) by road. Popinovo is the nearest rural locality.

References 

Rural localities in Petushinsky District